René Tissier (29 September 1899 – 5 January 1982) was a French racing cyclist. He rode in the 1920 Tour de France.

References

1899 births
1982 deaths
French male cyclists
Place of birth missing